Rancho Gordo (literally " the fat ranch" from the Spanish) is a specialty producer and seller of heirloom beans based in Napa County, California.

History 
The company was founded by Steve Sando, a former web designer, Jazz radio disc jockey, and wholesaler of Esprit clothing who now runs the company. After burning out in his former career, Sando decided to grow heirloom tomatoes, despite having no experience in agriculture.  When another farmer asked for help marketing beans, he decided to grow beans instead;  Sando gathered bean seeds from Seed Savers Exchange, and found new varieties of beans in Oaxaca, Mexico.

Beans and other products are sourced from local growers in California's central valley, Oregon and Washington, as well as Mexico, Peru, Poland and Bolivia. By 2018 the company was selling 500,000 pounds of beans per year. Most of the dried beans produced are sold in specially labeled packages through Rancho Gordo's website or other internet sales, at the company's store in Napa, via wholesalers, or directly at farmers' markets. The company also operates a "bean club" with a 40,000 member waiting list as of 2022.

Restaurants 
American chef Thomas Keller found Rancho Gordo beans at a farmers' market in Yountville, California, and now uses the beans in his French Laundry and Per Se restaurants. He endorses the beans and the company, and promotes the use of heirloom beans.

Other Products 
The company also markets hot sauce, dried pozole corn, grains such as quinoa, and chili peppers.

Steve Sando has written six books on beans: Heirloom Beans (2009, 2013), co-written with Vanessa Barrington, The Rancho Gordo Heirloom Bean Growers Guide (2011, 2019), Supper at Rancho Gordo (2014), The Rancho Gordo Vegetarian Kitchen (2017) co-written with Julia Newberry, French Beans (2018) co-written with Georgeanne Brennan, and The Rancho Gordo Pozole Book (2019).

New Varieties 
In 2015, Rancho Gordo introduced the Marcella bean, grown on the West Coast from Italian sorana seed at the suggestion of cookbook author Marcella Hazan. The bean was harvested just as Hazan died and Sando marketed the bean as 'Marcella' in tribute to her, with the blessings of her husband, Victor.

References

External links
ranchogordo.com - official website
Rancho Gordo company blog
Heirloom Beans - descriptions and recipes from Rancho Gordo

Cuisine of the San Francisco Bay Area
Agriculture companies of the United States